Douthit is a surname. Notable people with the surname include:

Marcus Douthit (born 1980), American-Filipino basketball player
Taylor Douthit (1901–1986), Major League Baseball outfielder